Eduard Ergartovich Rossel (born 8 October 1937) is a Russian politician, who was the governor (1995–2009) of Sverdlovsk Oblast, an oblast in Russia. He returned into office in 1995. He is a member of the Federation Council of Russia.

Childhood and war
Eduard Rossel was born in Bor, Nizhny Novgorod Oblast to Volga German parents. His father was executed by the NKVD in 1938 and he was left living with his mother, who at that time found a Ukrainian man and married him instead. Rossel's original language was German, but due to his mother's marriage to a Soviet national, he began to primarily speak Russian at home instead. He lived with his mother and stepfather until 1942, when both of his parents were forced into oppressive “labor camps” in Ukhta. He lived completely alone for three days, until a neighbor took him in. Realizing that she had many children to feed, he decided in fall 1942 to leave, taking along a bag and pocket knife.

He went to a train station, and while the train guard wasn't looking, sneaked into it and remained there until the train reached Kirov. There, he went out and decided to beg for food because he was hungry, but the Soviet militsiya captured him and forced Rossel into a children's penal colony. He escaped the colony three days later, returned to the station and took the train to Verkhnekamsk. Rossel's mother was released in October 1947, and she reunited with him the same year.

Following the defiance of the brutal Russian Soviet regime, mother and child moved to Gerd-Yol, a city on the outskirts of Ukhta, Komi Republic. Rossel attended first grade and after attending school for seven years, decided to attend the Agricultural TVET in Syktyvkar but racist attempts against Germany seemingly denied him this option because of anti-German racism.

In 1962, Rossel graduated from the Ural State Mining University. He also holds a PhD in Technical Sciences and a doctoral degree in Economics and is an academician of the Russian Academy of Engineering and of the International Academy of Regional Cooperation and Development.

Career
Prior to his career, Eduard Rossel made up his mind that he should never skip a single promotion. Prior to his political career, he was the head of the Sreduralstroy, an Ural based company. In 1974, Rossel met Boris Yeltsin (who in 1991 was elected as the first President of Russia after the collapse of the Soviet Union) at the metallurgy factory, Blooming-1500. During that time, Rossel already worked as head engineer of the Tagilstroy Trust, which was under the control of Alexei Kosygin.

In 1978, Eduard Rossel declined promotion from Boris Yeltsin, who wanted him to become a mayor of Nizhny Tagil. A few days after his election as mayor, Rossel got a visit from Alexander Avdonin, a geologist and local historian, who back then discovered, along with Geliy Ryabov, the burial site of the Romanov Dynasty.

He served as a governor of the Sverdlovsk Oblast from 1991 to 2009.

Rossel supported Boris Yeltsin during his rise to power. Yeltsin and Rossel became more hostile for a time due to Rossel's demand that Sverdlovsk Oblast have a status equal to that of Russia's republics. Rossel eventually returned to Yeltsin's favor, and in January 1996 Rossel won passage of a special bilateral agreement between Moscow and Sverdlovsk.

In 2005, Eduard Rossel awarded his successor, Alexey Vorobyov, the Order of Merit for the Fatherland, 3rd class.

In 2005 Eduard Rossel authored a book entitled A Regional Perspective on the Current and Future Socio-Economic Developments in the Russian Federation, which was published in an English edition by Anthony Rowe Publishing Services on behalf of Intourist Ltd. On Wednesday, 13 April 2005, Eduard Rossel was guest and speaker at a reception held at the Russian Embassy in Kensington Palace Gardens, London for the launch of his book. In his book Eduard Rossel gives a detailed microeconomic picture of the problems, prospects and performance of the economy and government at a regional level, and focuses on the importance of the natural resources of Russia's regions to the economy of Russia. He also gives a picture of the political structure of the Federation at a time when government of the regions was becoming more centralised. 

In 2009, Rossel left the gubernatorial post, citing his own failed competency.

In 2018, Eduard Rossel met with vice governor of Sverdlovsk Oblast Aleksey Orlov, finance minister Victoria Kazakova, director of trust company "Belaya Gora", and head of the administration of Nizhniy Tagil, Vladislav Pinaev to discuss whether Belaya Gora should become a tourist resort. The plan is to create a ski resort with the help from the Canadian company Ecosign.

Honours
Order of Merit for the Fatherland;
1st class (16 November 2009) - for outstanding contribution to strengthening Russian statehood, the socio-economic development of the field and many years of fruitful activity
2nd class (5 April 2004) - for his great personal contribution to the development of Russian statehood and economic and social transformation of the region
3rd class (24 April 2000) - for outstanding contribution to strengthening Russian statehood and the consistent implementation of the course of economic reforms
4th class (20 July 1996) - for services to the state and many years of diligent work
Order of Honour (9 October 2007) - for outstanding contribution to the socio-economic development of the field and many years of fruitful activity
Order of the Badge of Honour, twice
for achievements in the construction of the first stage of rolling wide-flange beams shop - blooming "1500" Nizhny Tagil Metallurgical Plant named after VI Lenin (April 1975)
for the successful completion of the reconstruction of oxygen-converter shop of Nizhny Tagil Metallurgical Plant named after VI Lenin (May 1980)
 Medal "For Valiant Labor. To commemorate the 100th anniversary of the birth of Vladimir Ilyich Lenin" (November 1969)
 Diploma of the President of the Russian Federation (12 December 2008) - for active participation in the drafting of the Constitution and a great contribution to the democratic foundations of the Russian Federation
Order of Friendship of Peoples (Belarus, 8 October 2007) - for his great personal contribution to strengthening and developing economic, scientific, technological and cultural ties between Belarus and Sverdlovsk Oblast of the Russian Federation
Order "Dostyk" (Kazakhstan, 2008)
Medal "Dank" (Kyrgyzstan, 27 May 1999) - for his significant contribution to strengthening friendship, economic and cultural cooperation between the Kyrgyz Republic and the Russian Federation at the regional level
Order "For Services to the State of Baden-Württemberg" (Baden-Wurttemberg, Germany, 2008) - for outstanding contribution to the international inter-regional cooperation
Order of Holy Prince Daniel of Moscow, 1st (Russian Orthodox Church, 2003) and 2nd (1997) classes
Order of St. Sergius, 1st class (Russian Orthodox Church, 2000)
Order of Saint Blessed Prince Dimitry (Russian Orthodox Church, 2002)
Order of St. Seraphim of Sarov, 2nd class (Russian Orthodox Church, 2009)
Honorary citizen of Yekaterinburg, Nizhny Tagil and the Sverdlovsk region (Decree of the Governor of Sverdlovsk region № 883-HS, 7 October 2010)
Honoured Builder of the RSFSR (1983)

Personal life
Eduard Rossel has a daughter who resides in Düsseldorf.

References

External links

1937 births
Living people
People from Bor, Nizhny Novgorod Oblast
Volga German people
United Russia politicians
21st-century Russian politicians
Communist Party of the Soviet Union members
Governors of Sverdlovsk Oblast
Heads of the federal subjects of Russia of German descent
Full Cavaliers of the Order "For Merit to the Fatherland"
Recipients of the Order of Honour (Russia)
Recipients of the Order of Holy Prince Daniel of Moscow
Members of the Federation Council of Russia (1994–1996)
Members of the Federation Council of Russia (1996–2000)
Members of the Federation Council of Russia (after 2000)